Tennessee Titans Stadium is an American football stadium that has been proposed for use by the Tennessee Titans to be constructed in Nashville, Tennessee and succeed Nissan Stadium beginning in 2026.

The 60,000 seat stadium would cost $2.1 billion and be built adjacent to Nissan Stadium, which would be demolished following the completion of the new stadium. The stadium will be designed by Manica Architecture who previously designed Allegiant Stadium, NRG Stadium and Wembley Stadium.

History

Background
Nissan Stadium, an open-air concrete-and-steel stadium which seats 69,000, has served as the home venue for the Tennessee Titans since its opening in 1999.  The city hired an independent group, Venue Solutions Group (VSG), to conduct a thorough assessment of the current stadium’s condition and the cost of maintaining it for the remainder of the lease, which ends in 2039.  VSG outlined a preliminary report showing it would cost the city between $1.75 and 1.95 billion to renovate Nissan Stadium as a “first class condition” facility.

Planning and construction
The $2.1 billion needed to fund the new stadium will come from a variety of sources:
 $840 million from the team
 $500 million from the state of Tennessee
 $760 million from revenue bonds issued by the Metro Sports Authority to be repaid via personal-seat license sales and taxes collected at the stadium and additional money from a new 1% hotel/motel tax.

The 1.7-million-square-foot proposed stadium would be a dome, have a seating capacity of 55,000-60,000, have approximately 170 luxury suites and an artificial turf field. The Titans would sign a 30-year lease to play in the stadium.

References

Tennessee Titans stadiums
Proposed stadiums in the United States